Beware the Gonzo is a 2010 romantic comedy-drama film written and directed by Bryan Goluboff. Ezra Miller stars as the eponymous Gonzo, a high school student who creates an underground newspaper. Zoe Kravitz, Jesse McCartney, Griffin Newman, Campbell Scott, and Amy Sedaris appear in supporting roles. Its title refers to a style of first-person confrontational journalism developed by Hunter S. Thompson in the early 1970s.

The film debuted at the Tribeca Film Festival in April 2010.

Plot
After being fired from his high school paper by editor Gavin Reilly, Eddie "Gonzo" Gilman establishes an underground paper with his friends Rob Becker, Ming Na, and Schneeman to give a voice to unpopular students. Eddie's idea catches the attention of Evie Wallace, who joins the paper's team out of disdain for Gavin. The first issue causes a commotion throughout the school and Principal Roy and Gavin offer to give Eddie his own section in the main paper if he tones down his content. Eddie, however, refuses to censor his articles, even under the threat of suspension.

For the second issue, Eddie exposes the unsanitary conditions of his school's cafeteria, causing the cafeteria to be closed by the health inspector. The issue brings popularity to Eddie in the high school, which grows when Principal Roy suspends him. He and Evie also enter into a relationship. However, Gavin attempts to damage Eddie's reputation by falsely claiming Eddie staged the conditions as a favor to diner owner Errol, Eddie's first advertiser. Eddie retaliates by writing an exposé on Gavin, where he reveals that Gavin had Schneeman write a paper for him in exchange for not being bullied and humiliated an anonymous girl (Evie) with his friends after having sex with her; information that Schneeman and Evie trusted him to not make public. After the article is released, Eddie's friends break off contact with him and he is indefinitely suspended from school, pending a likely expulsion.

At the advice of his father, Eddie creates a video apologizing for his actions and his suspension is lifted. The apology earns him back the respect of many of his classmates, although his friends (except for Rob) continue to refuse to speak with him. Nevertheless, Evie reaches out to Eddie again. The two make amends and resume their relationship.

Cast
 Ezra Miller as Eddie "Gonzo" Gilman
 Zoë Kravitz as Evie Wallace
 Griffin Newman as Horny Rob Becker
 Stefanie Hong as Ming Na
 Edward Gelbinovich as Schneeman
 Jesse McCartney as Gavin Reilly
 Amy Sedaris as Diane Gilman
 Campbell Scott as Arthur Gilman
 James Urbaniak as Principal Roy
 Marc John Jefferies as Stone
 Lucian Maisel as Malloy
 Jerry Grayson as Errol
 Yul Vazquez as Charlie Ronald
 Judah Friedlander as Cafeteria guy
 Noah Fleiss as Ryan
 Matthew Shear as Dave Melnick
 Conor Leslie as Amy
 Colby Minifie as Melanie

Reception
Beware the Gonzo received mixed reviews; the film has a 44% rating on Rotten Tomatoes and a 36/100 rating on Metacritic.

References

External links
 
 
 
 

2010 films
2010 independent films
2010 romantic comedy-drama films
American high school films
American independent films
American romantic comedy-drama films
American satirical films
American teen films
Films about journalism
Films shot in New York City
2010 comedy films
2010 drama films
2010s English-language films
2010s American films